Derlis Paredes (born 4 July 1985) is a Paraguayan former footballer.

His last club was Deportivo Quevedo.

External links
 
 

1985 births
Living people
Paraguayan footballers
Paraguayan expatriate footballers
Club Sol de América footballers
12 de Octubre Football Club players
Municipal Real Mamoré players
Club Aurora players
La Paz F.C. players
Lota Schwager footballers
Expatriate footballers in Chile
Expatriate footballers in Bolivia
People from Alto Paraná Department
Association football forwards